The 1990–91 Sunbelt Independent Soccer League was an American indoor soccer season run by the Sunbelt Independent Soccer League during the winter of 1990-91.

History
In the fall of 1990, the league expanded outside of the western United States for the first time when it added teams from Arkansas, Georgia and Tennessee.  The expansion led the league to change its name to the Sunbelt Independent Soccer League.

Regular season
 Win = 4 points
 Loss = 0 points

Southeast Conference

Southwest Conference

Playoffs

Semifinals

Oklahoma City Warriors vs Fort Worth Kickers

Colorado Comets vs Tucson Amigos

Final

Points leaders

Awards
MVP:  Chino Melendez, Colorado Comets
Top Goal Scorer:  Albertico Morales, Tucson Amigos
Rookie of the Year:  Albertico Morales, Tucson Amigos
Coach of the Year:  Caesar Cervin, Ft. Worth Kickers

References

External links
United Soccer Leagues (RSSSF)
The Year in American Soccer - 1991

USISL indoor seasons
Sunbelt Independent Soccer League, 1990-91
Sunbelt Independent Soccer League, 1990-91